

Æthelnoth (or Æthilnoth; died between 816 and 824) was a medieval Bishop of London.

Æthelnoth was consecrated between 805 and 811. He died between 816 and 824.

Citations

References

External links
 

Bishops of London
9th-century deaths
Year of birth unknown
9th-century English bishops